Chandgaon is a  thana of Chattogram District in Chattogram Division, Bangladesh. It comprises the Chandgoan Residential Area and the Kalurghat Industrial Area.

Geography
It has 40,888 households and a total area of 32.14 km2.

Demographics
According to the 1991 Bangladesh census, Chandgaon had a population of 219,641, of whom 119,069 were aged 18 or older. Males constituted 56.4% of the population, and females 43.6%. Chandgaon had an average literacy rate of 46.5% (7+ years), against the national average of 32.4%.

Points of interest
Zia Park is an amusement park located in the area.

Administration
Chandgaon has 6 Unions/Wards, 14 Mauzas/Mahallas, and 0 villages.
The postcode is 4212.

The current commissioner of the Chandgaon ward is Commissioner MR Esrarul Haque Esrar under Chittagong City Corporation.

Education

Hajera Taju University College is the only college in the thana. The madrasa education system includes one Kamil madrasa.

See also
Thanas of Bangladesh
Upazilas of Bangladesh
Districts of Bangladesh
Divisions of Bangladesh

References

External links

Thanas of Chittagong District